Mikhail Pavlovich Lysov (born 29 January 1998) is a Russian former professional football player who played as a left back.

Club career
He made his debut in the Russian Premier League for FC Lokomotiv Moscow on 18 July 2017 in a game against FC Arsenal Tula.

In late September 2020, he was diagnosed with blood vessels issues and the doctors recommended that he stop playing football for several months, he will be kept under observation. He retired in July 2021 due to heart complications.

Honours

Club
Lokomotiv Moscow
Russian Premier League: 2017–18
Russian Cup: 2018–19

Career statistics

Club

References

External links
 

1998 births
People from Vladimir, Russia
Living people
Russian footballers
Association football defenders
Russia youth international footballers
Russia under-21 international footballers
FC Lokomotiv Moscow players
Russian Premier League players
Sportspeople from Vladimir Oblast